Tohtaji Ablikim (born 7 September 2002) is a Chinese footballer currently playing as a midfielders for Nantong Zhiyun.

Career statistics

Club
.

References

2002 births
Living people
Footballers from Xinjiang
Chinese footballers
Association football midfielders
Nantong Zhiyun F.C. players